Shangri-La is the fourth mini-album by the South Korean boy band VIXX. It was released on May 15, 2017 under the label of Jellyfish Entertainment. It features the single of the same name.

Background and release
On March 23, 2017, Jellyfish Entertainment announced that the members of VIXX were working on their new album with a release goal set for May. On April 6, the agency revealed that as part of their 5th anniversary celebration, VIXX will be holding a concert, have an album release and an exhibition. The celebration made to be a festival titled "VIXX V FESTIVAL" would start with their VIXX Live Fantasia Daydream concert from May 12 to the 14th and their comeback song will be revealed for the first time. They'll be releasing their album right after and then hold an exhibition.

The name and date of the album was announced on May 2, under the name “Do Won Kyung", and scheduled for release May 15. On May 4, VIXX released a series of individual shots of the members along with their birth flowers followed by individual shots of the members with their birthstones on May 5.

On May 5, VIXX released a concept performance film featuring a solo dance performance from N on Naver TV and YouTube. On May 7, VIXX revealed the album's tracklist consisting of five songs including an instrumental track of the title song “Do Won Kyung”. It was also announced that the album would come in two versions, Birthstone and Birth Flower which both come with a  CD, 68 page photobook, bookmark, postcard and a poster. The album also has a  Kihno set which has the Kihno card, a postcard set, photo card set and a poster.

Shangri-La was released along with the title track's music video on  May 15, 2017.

Promotion
VIXX will begin promoting Shangri-La with live performances on KBS2's You Hee-yeol's Sketchbook music program, on May 16, 2017, followed by performances on the following music programs; Mnet's M! Countdown,  SBS MTV's The Show, MBC Music's Show Champion, KBS's Music Bank, MBC's Show! Music Core and SBS's Inkigayo.

Track listing
The credits are adapted from the official homepage of the group.

Awards and nominations

Music program awards

Chart performance

Release history

See also
 List of K-pop albums on the Billboard charts

References

External links
 
 Shangri-La - EP on iTunes

2017 EPs
VIXX albums
Korean-language EPs
Jellyfish Entertainment EPs
Stone Music Entertainment EPs